The Middle East operations commemorative medal was a French commemorative medal established on 22 May 1957 to recognize the participation of French nationals in the military operations conducted during the Suez Crisis of 1956.

Historical background
In 1956, Egyptian President Nasser decided to nationalize the Suez Canal Company, this action was against French and British interests in the region leading to a military intervention by both countries. For its part, France decided to send a 10,000 man strong expeditionary force under the command of Admiral Pierre Barjot and General André Beaufre.

Under heavy diplomatic pressure from both the United States and the USSR, the Franco-British forces withdrew from the retaken territories and the entire expedition was abandoned after barely four months.  The French forces had suffered fifteen dead.

Award statute
The Middle East operations commemorative medal was awarded to French soldiers from all three services and civilians (including the crews of merchant vessels and civilian airliners) for participation in the operations that took place in the geographical area lying between the 20th and 36th Northern parallels and the 24th and 40th Eastern meridians between 1 September and 22 December 1956.

The medal is not issued with a certificate and the right to wear it is justified by the possession of a military document confirming participation in the operations.  No one can claim the right to wear this medal if condemned to a prison term or severe punishment for reprehensible actions carried out during the operation.  Applications for the award are made at the office of the French Ministry of Defence.

Award description
The Middle East operations commemorative medal is a 30mm in diameter circular medal struck from bronze, it may be gilt. The obverse bears the relief image of the "warrior republic" in the form of the left profile of a helmeted woman's bust, the helmet being adorned by a crown of oak leaves. On either side, the relief inscription along the circumference "RÉPUBLIQUE FRANÇAISE".

On the reverse, the relief inscription on five lines "MÉDAILLE COMMÉMORATIVE DES OPÉRATIONS DU MOYEN-ORIENT 1956".

The medal hangs from a ribbon through a ring passing through the medal's suspension loop. The ring is adorned by a 24mm in diameter bronze laurel wreath and half crescent. The silk moiré ribbon is 37mm wide and is light blue with a yellow central 7mm wide and 2mm wide stripes 2mm from the edges.

A gilt clasp bearing the relief inscription "MOYEN-ORIENT" is worn on the ribbon.

Notable recipients (partial list)

 Admiral Pierre Barjot
 Admiral Jacques Lanxade
 General André Beaufre
 General Jean Simon
 Colonel Philippe Erulin
 Major Hélie de Saint Marc

References

External links
 Museum of the Legion of Honour (in French)

Awards established in 1957
French campaign medals
1957 establishments in France
Suez Crisis
Egypt–France relations